The Labour Party (abbreviated as PvdA,  or P van de A) is a social-democratic political party in the Netherlands.

The party was founded in 1946 as a merger of the Social Democratic Workers' Party, the Free-thinking Democratic League and the Christian Democratic Union. Prime Ministers from the Labour Party have been Willem Drees (1948–1958), Joop den Uyl (1973–1977) and Wim Kok (1994–2002). From 2012 to 2017, the PvdA formed the second-largest party in parliament and was the junior partner in the Second Rutte cabinet with the People's Party for Freedom and Democracy. The Leader of the Labour Party is Attje Kuiken.

The party fell to nine seats in the House of Representatives at the 2017 general election, making it the seventh-largest faction in the chamber—its worst showing ever. However, the party rebounded with a first-place finish in the 2019 European Parliament election in the Netherlands, winning six of 26 seats, with 19% of the vote. The party is a member of the European Party of European Socialists and the global Progressive Alliance. In the European Parliament, where the Labour Party has 6 seats, it is part of the Progressive Alliance of Socialists and Democrats.

History

1946–1965 

During the German occupation of the Netherlands in the Second World War, a group of prominent Dutchmen of all democratic political ideologies were interned as hostages in St. Michielsgestel by the German occupation authorities. They came to the consensus that the pre-war fragmentation of Dutch political life, known as "Pillarization", should be overcome after the war in a so-called doorbraak. These people formed the Dutch People's Movement (NVB) immediately after the war ended in 1945. The new movement promoted the foundation of the Labour Party (Partij van de Arbeid – PvdA) on 9 February 1946 through a merger of three pre-war parties, namely the Social Democratic Workers' Party (SDAP), the social-liberal Free-thinking Democratic League (VDB) and the progressive-Protestant Christian Democratic Union (CDU). They were joined by individuals from Catholic resistance group Christofoor, as well as some of the more progressive members of the Protestant parties Christian Historical Union (CHU) and Anti-Revolutionary Party (ARP). The founding Congress was chaired by NVB member Willem Banning.

The founders of the PvdA wanted to create a broad party, breaking with the historic tradition of pillarisation. The party combined socialists with liberal democrats and progressive Christians. However, the party was unable to break pillarisation. Instead the new party renewed the close ties that the SDAP had with other socialist organisations (see linked organisations). In 1948, some of the left-liberal members, led by former VDB leader Pieter Oud, left the PvdA after concluding it had become too socialist for their liking. Together with the Freedom Party, they formed the People's Party for Freedom and Democracy (VVD), a conservative-liberal party.

Between 1946 and 1958, the PvdA led centre-left coalition governments with the Catholic People's Party (KVP), and combinations of VVD, ARP and CHU, with the PvdA's Willem Drees as prime minister. The KVP and the PvdA together had a large majority in parliament. Under his leadership the Netherlands recovered from the war and began to build its welfare state, and Indonesia became independent.

After the cabinet crisis of 1958, the PvdA was replaced by the VVD. The PvdA was in opposition until 1965. The electoral support of PvdA voters began to decline.

1965–1989 

In 1965 a conflict in the KVP-ARP-CHU-VVD cabinet made continuation of the government impossible. The three confessional, Christian-influenced parties turned towards the PvdA. Together they formed the Cals cabinet, with KVP leader Jo Cals as prime minister. This cabinet too was short-lived and conflict-ridden. The conflicts culminated in the fall of the Cals cabinet over economic policy.

Meanwhile, a younger generation was attempting to gain control of the PvdA. A group of young PvdA members, calling themselves the New Left, changed the party. The New Left believed the party should become oriented towards the new social movements, adopting their anti-parliamentary strategies and their issues, such as women's liberation, environmental conservation and Third World development. Prominent New Left members were Jan Nagel, André van der Louw and Bram Peper. One of their early victories followed the fall of the Cals cabinet. The party Congress adopted a motion that made it impossible for the PvdA to govern with the KVP and its Protestant allies. In response to the growing power of the New Left group, a group of older, centrist party members, led by Willem Drees' son, Willem Drees Jr., founded the New Right. They split in 1970, after it was clear that they had lost the conflict with the New Left, and founded a new moderate Social Democratic party, Democratic Socialists '70 (DS70).

Under the New Left, the PvdA started a strategy of polarisation, striving for a cabinet based on a progressive majority in parliament. In order to form that cabinet, the PvdA allied itself with the social-liberal party Democrats 66 (D66) and the progressive Christian Political Party of Radicals (PPR). The alliance was called the Progressive Accord (PAK). In the 1971 and 1972 elections, these three parties promised to form a cabinet with a radical common programme after the elections. They were unable to gain a majority in either election. In 1971, they were kept out of cabinet, and the party of former PvdA members, DS70, became a partner of the First Biesheuvel cabinet.

In the 1972 elections, neither the PvdA and its allies or the KVP and its allies were able to gain a majority. The two sides were forced to work together. Joop den Uyl, the leader of the PvdA, led the cabinet. The cabinet was an extra-parliamentary cabinet and it was composed of members of the three progressive parties and members of the KVP and the ARP. The cabinet attempted to radically reform government, society and the economy, and a wide range of progressive social reforms were enacted during its time in office, such as significant increases in welfare payments and the indexation of benefits and the minimum wage to the cost of living.

The PvdA also faced economic decline and was riddled with personal and ideological conflicts. The relationship between Prime Minister Den Uyl and the KVP Deputy Prime Minister Dries Van Agt was particularly problematic. These conflict culminated when the cabinet fell just before the 1977 general election. The PvdA came first in that election, but the ideological and personal conflict between Van Agt and Den Uyl prevented the formation of a new centre-left cabinet. After very long cabinet formation talks, the Christian Democratic Appeal (CDA), itself a new Christian democratic political formation composed of KVP, CHU and ARP, formed a government, based on a very narrow majority, with the VVD. The PvdA was left in opposition.

In the 1981 general election, the incumbent CDA–VVD cabinet lost its majority. The CDA remained the largest party, but it was forced to co-operate with the PvdA and D66 (the PPR had left the alliance, after losing in the 1977 election). In the new cabinet led by Van Agt, Den Uyl returned to cabinet, now as Deputy Prime Minister. The personal and ideological conflict between Van Agt and Den Uyl culminated in the fall of the cabinet just months after it was formed. The VVD and the CDA together had a majority in the 1982 general election and retained this in the 1986 general election. The PvdA was left in opposition. During this period the party began to reform. Den Uyl left politics in 1986, appointing former trade union leader Wim Kok as his successor.

1989–2010 
After the 1989 general election the PvdA returned to cabinet together with the CDA. Kok became Deputy Prime Minister to CDA leader Ruud Lubbers. The PvdA accepted the major economic reforms the previous Lubbers cabinets made, including privatisation of public enterprises and reform of the welfare state. They continued these policies in this cabinet. The cabinet faced heavy protest from the unions and saw major political conflict within the PvdA itself.

In the 1994 general election the PvdA–CDA coalition lost its majority in parliament; the PvdA, however, emerged as the biggest party. Kok formed a government together with the conservative-liberal VVD and social-liberal D66. This so-called 'purple government' was a political novelty, because it was the first since 1918 without any ministers from the CDA or its predecessors. The First Kok cabinet continued the Lubbers-era economic reforms, but combined this with a progressive outlook on ethical questions and promises of political reform. Kok became a very popular Prime Minister; he was not a partisan figure but combined successful technocratic policies with the charisma of a national leader. In the 1998 general election, the cabinet was rewarded for its stewardship of the economy. The PvdA and the VVD increased their seats, at the expense of D66; the Second Kok cabinet was formed.

Kok left politics, leaving the leadership of the party to his preferred successor Ad Melkert. The PvdA was expected to perform very well in the 2002 general election; but the political rise of Pim Fortuyn frustrated these hopes. The PvdA lost the 2002 election, and the party's parliamentary representation fell from 45 seats to 23. The loss was blamed on the uncharismatic new leader Melkert, the perceived arrogance of the PvdA and the inability to answer the right-wing populist issues Fortuyn raised, especially immigration and integration. Melkert resigned as party leader and was replaced by Jeltje van Nieuwenhoven. The PvdA was kept out of cabinet. The government formed by CDA, VVD and the Pim Fortuyn List (LPF) fell after a very short period.

Meanwhile, Wouter Bos, Undersecretary in the Second Kok cabinet, was elected leader of the PvdA in a ballot among PvdA members, being elected closely to Jouke de Vries. He started to democratise the party organisation and began an ideological reorientation. In the 2003 general election, Wouter Bos managed to regain almost all seats lost in the previous election, and the PvdA was once again the second largest party in the Netherlands, only slightly smaller than the CDA. Personal and ideological conflicts between Bos and the CDA leader Jan Peter Balkenende prevented the formation of a CDA–PvdA cabinet. Instead, the PvdA was kept out of government by the formation of cabinet of the CDA, the VVD, and D66, the latter being former allies of PvdA. In the 2006 municipal elections, the renewed PvdA performed very well. The PvdA became by far the largest party nationally, while the three governing parties lost a considerable number of seats in municipal councils.

The PvdA lost the race for Prime Minister to the CDA after suffering a loss of nine seats in the 2006 general election. The PvdA now held only 33 seats, losing many votes to the Socialist Party (SP). The PvdA had previously distanced themselves from the idea of a voting bloc on the left. It did, however, join the fourth Balkenende cabinet on 22 February 2007, in which Wouter Bos became minister of Finance. In the aftermath of the lost elections, the entire party executive stepped down on 26 April 2007. On Saturday 20 February 2010, the Labour Party withdrew from the government after arguments over the Dutch role in Afghanistan.

2010–present 
After withdrawing from the government, Wouter Bos announced he would leave politics to spend more time with his wife and two daughters. The then mayor of Amsterdam, Job Cohen, took his place as leader of the PvdA. In the 2010 election, the PvdA won 30 seats, a loss of three, and was narrowly overtaken by the VVD. After the election, a 'purple coalition' was considered – it would have required a fourth party in addition to the VVD, PvdA and D66 – but talks broke down and the PvdA entered opposition.

Cohen resigned as leader in February 2012. Diederik Samsom was subsequently elected the party leader. In the 2012 general election the Labour Party won 38 seats, a gain of eight, defying initial predictions that the Socialist Party would overtake it. Following the election the party entered a governing coalition with the VVD under Mark Rutte, with Labour's Lodewijk Asscher becoming Deputy Prime Minister.

Opinion polls suggested that popular support for the PvdA fell into a gradual decline in the years after the 2012 election. The party was polled as low as 5% by Peil on 8 May 2016. In December 2016 Samson was defeated by Lodewijk Asscher in a party leadership election.

In the Dutch general election of 2017, the PvdA suffered the biggest defeat in Dutch electoral history, receiving only 5.7% of the votes and losing 29 of its 38 seats. Asscher did not resign from his post, claiming the defeat was his predecessor's responsibility. The party experienced a degree of revival in 2019, obtaining the most votes in that year's European Parliament election. This marked the first time the PvdA had finished first in a national election since 1998.

Ahead of the 2021 general election, Asscher resigned from the party leadership due to his part in the childcare benefits scandal. He was replaced as leader and lijsttrekker by Lilianne Ploumen, who became the party's first permanent female leader. Following the election, the PvdA participated unsuccessfully in the 2021 Dutch cabinet formation in conjunction with GreenLeft. Ploumen later left, claiming she was unsuited for the leadership. She was replaced as parliamentary leader by Attje Kuiken.

Ideology 

The PvdA began as a traditional social-democratic party, committed to building a welfare state. During the 1970s it included new issues in its programme such as environmental conservation, Third World development and women's liberation. During the 1990s it moderated its programme to include Third Way economic and social positions, including reform of the welfare state and privatisation of public enterprise. The party adopted a new programme of principles in 2005, expressing a centre-left ideology. Its core issues are employment, social security and welfare as well as investing in public education, health care and public safety.

Organisation

Leadership 

 Leaders
 Willem Drees (9 February 1946 – 22 December 1958)
 Jaap Burger (22 December 1958 – 16 September 1962)
 Anne Vondeling (16 September 1962 – 13 September 1966)
 Joop den Uyl (13 September 1966 – 21 July 1986)
 Wim Kok (21 July 1986 – 15 December 2001)
 Ad Melkert (15 December 2001 – 16 May 2002)
 Vacant (16 May 2002 – 12 November 2002)
 Wouter Bos (12 November 2002 – 25 April 2010)
 Job Cohen (25 April 2010 – 20 February 2012)
 Vacant (20 February 2012 – 16 March 2012)
 Diederik Samsom (16 March 2012 – 10 December 2016)
 Lodewijk Asscher (10 December 2016 – 14 January 2021)
 Vacant (14 January 2021 – 23 January 2021)
 Lilianne Ploumen (23 January 2021 – 12 April 2022)
 Vacant (since 12 April 2022)

 Chairs
 Koos Vorrink (9 February 1946 – 5 June 1953)
 Hein Vos (5 June 1953 – 23 February 1955)
 Evert Vermeer (23 February 1955 – 10 May 1960)
 Hein Vos (10 May 1960 – 24 March 1961; ad interim)
 Ko Suurhoff (24 March 1961 – 14 April 1965)
 Vacant (14 April 1965 – 12 June 1965)
 Sjeng Tans (12 June 1965 – 7 March 1969)
 Anne Vondeling (7 March 1969 – 1 May 1971)
 André van der Louw (1 May 1971 – 16 November 1974)
 Ien van den Heuvel-de Blank (16 November 1974 – 26 April 1979)
 Max van den Berg (26 April 1979 – 1 August 1986)
 Stan Poppe (1 August 1986 – 2 April 1987; ad interim)
 Marjanne Sint (2 April 1987 – 1 August 1991)
 Frits Castricum (1 August 1991 – 13 March 1992; ad interim)
 Felix Rottenberg (13 March 1992 – 15 February 1997; co-chair)
 Ruud Vreeman (13 March 1992 – 15 February 1997; co-chair)
 Karin Adelmund (15 February 1997 – 3 August 1998)
 Ruud Vreeman (3 August 1998 – 20 February 1999; ad interim)
 Marijke van Hees (20 February 1999 – 5 September 2000)
 Mariëtte Hamer (5 September 2000 – 16 March 2001; ad interim)
 Ruud Koole (16 March 2001 – 9 December 2005)
 Michiel van Hulten (9 December 2005 – 25 April 2007)
 Ruud Koole (25 April 2007 – 6 October 2007; ad interim)
 Lilianne Ploumen (6 October 2007 – 22 January 2012)
 Hans Spekman (22 January 2012 – 7 October 2017)
 Nelleke Vedelaar (7 October 2017 – 1 October 2021)
 Esther-Mirjam Sent (since 1 October 2021)

 Parliamentary leaders in the Senate
 Marius Reinalda (9 February 1946 – 18 March 1947)
 Jo van de Kieft (27 March 1947 – 15 July 1952)
 Kees Woudenberg (15 July 1952 – 2 September 1952)
 Joris in 't Veld (2 September 1952 – 15 November 1960)
 Hein Vos (15 November 1960 – 16 February 1968)
 Maarten de Niet (5 March 1968 – 7 October 1968)
 Jan Broeksz (7 October 1968 – 16 September 1975)
 Anne Vermeer (16 September 1975 – 23 June 1987)
 Ger Schinck (23 June 1987 – 13 June 1995)
 Joop van den Berg (13 June 1995 – 1 August 1996)
 Job Cohen (1 August 1996 – 3 August 1998)
 Ria Jaarsma (3 August 1998 – 8 June 1999)
 Geertje Lycklama à Nijeholt (8 June 1999 – 10 June 2003)
 Johan Stekelenburg (10 June 2003 – 22 September 2003)
 Han Noten (11 November 2003 – 7 June 2011)
 Marleen Barth (7 June 2011 – 8 February 2018)
 André Postema (8 February 2018 – 10 July 2018)
 Esther-Mirjam Sent (4 September 2018 – 11 June 2019)
 Mei Li Vos (since 11 June 2019)

 Parliamentary leaders in the House of Representatives
 Marinus van der Goes van Naters (4 June 1946 – 16 January 1951)
 Jaap Burger (16 January 1951 – 18 September 1951)
 Leendert Antonie Donker (18 September 1951 – 2 September 1952)
 Jaap Burger (2 September 1952 – 16 September 1962)
 Anne Vondeling (16 September 1962 – 14 April 1965)
 Gerard Nederhorst (14 April 1965 – 23 February 1967)
 Joop den Uyl (23 February 1967 – 11 May 1973)
 Ed van Thijn (11 May 1973 – 8 June 1977)
 Joop den Uyl (8 June 1977 – 8 September 1977)
 Ed van Thijn (8 September 1977 – 16 January 1978)
 Joop den Uyl (16 January 1978 – 11 September 1981)
 Wim Meijer (11 September 1981 – 16 September 1982)
 Joop den Uyl (16 September 1982 – 21 July 1986)
 Wim Kok (21 July 1986 – 4 November 1989)
 Thijs Wöltgens (4 November 1989 – 17 May 1994)
 Wim Kok (17 May 1994 – 22 August 1994)
 Jacques Wallage (22 August 1994 – 19 May 1998)
 Wim Kok (19 May 1998 – 30 May 1998)
 Jacques Wallage (30 May 1998 – 10 July 1998)
 Ad Melkert (10 July 1998 – 16 May 2002)
 Jeltje van Nieuwenhoven (16 May 2002 – 19 November 2002)
 Wouter Bos (19 November 2002 – 22 February 2007)
 Jacques Tichelaar (22 February 2007 – 22 January 2008)
 Mariëtte Hamer (22 January 2008 – 17 June 2010)
 Job Cohen (17 June 2010 – 20 February 2012)
 Jeroen Dijsselbloem (20 February 2012 – 20 March 2012)
 Diederik Samsom (20 March 2012 – 12 December 2016)
 Attje Kuiken (12 December 2016 – 23 March 2017)
 Lodewijk Asscher (23 March 2017 – 14 January 2021)
 Lilianne Ploumen (14 January 2021 – 12 April 2022)
 Attje Kuiken (since 22 April 2022)

Organisational structure 

The highest organ of the PvdA is the Congress, formed by delegates from the municipal branches. It convenes once every year. It appoints the party board, decides the order of candidates on electoral lists for the Senate, House of Representatives and European Parliament and has the final say over the party programme. Since 2002, a referendum of all members has partially replaced the Congress. Both the lijsttrekker of the House of Representatives candidate list, who is the political leader of the party, and the party chairman, who leads the party organisation, are selected by such a referendum. In 2002, Wouter Bos won the PvdA leadership election.

Members 
As of 2020, PvdA has 42,794 members. They are organised in over 500 municipal branches.

Linked organisations 
Rood is the party periodical. It appears eight times a year. The Young Socialists is the youth organisation of the PvdA. It is a member of Young European Socialists and the International Union of Socialist Youth. They publish the periodical Lava.

The scientific institute (or think tank) of the PvdA is the Wiardi Beckman Foundation. It publishes the periodical Socialisme & Democratie. The PvdA participates in the Netherlands Institute for Multiparty Democracy, a democracy assistance organisation of seven Dutch political parties.

International organisations 
The PvdA is a full member of the Party of European Socialists and was formerly an observer member of the Socialist International until December 2014, having previously downgraded their membership in December 2012. The PvdA joined the Progressive Alliance, a new international network for social democratic political parties, at its founding event on 22 May 2013.

Pillarised organisations 
During the period of strong pillarisation the PvdA had strong links with the social democratic broadcasting organisation VARA Broadcasting Association, the Dutch Association of Trade Unions, and the paper Het Vrije Volk.

Relationships to other parties 
Historically, the PvdA has co-operated in cabinets with the Christian democratic Christian Democratic Appeal (CDA), Political Party of Radicals (PPR), Catholic People's Party (KVP), Anti-Revolutionary Party (ARP), Christian Historical Union (CHU) and ChristianUnion (CU) parties and the liberal parties Democrats 66 (D66) and People's Party for Freedom and Democracy (VVD). Between 1971 and 1977, PvdA was allied with D66 and the PPR. After 1977 until 1989, it was closely allied to D66. Since 2003, the relationship between the PvdA and D66 has considerably worsened, at first because PvdA was in opposition to the Second Balkenende cabinet, in which D66 had co-operated.

During the governance of the second and third Balkenende cabinet, the Socialist Party and GreenLeft were calling for closer cooperation with the PvdA, calling to form a shadow government against the Balkenende cabinet, PvdA leader Bos held this off.

The PvdA has strong ties with GreenLeft. In the 2021 Dutch cabinet formation the parties unsuccessfully combined. Prominent members including Frans Timmermans and Marjolein Moorman have called for a deepened collaboration. A merger has also been discussed. The Wiardi Beckman Foundation has voiced its opposition to this.

Electoral results

House of Representatives

Senate

European Parliament

Representation

Members of the House of Representatives 
The eight members of the House of Representatives for the Labour Party are the following:
 Julian Bushoff
 Joris Thijssen
 Habtamu de Hoop
 Kati Piri
 Attje Kuiken
 Barbara Kathmann
 Henk Nijboer
 Songül Mutluer

Members of the Senate 
The eight members (four men, four women) of the Senate for the Labour Party are the following:
 Esther-Mirjam Sent, parliamentary leader
 Jannette Beuving
 Jopie Nooren
 Mohamed Sini
 André Postema
 Lambert Verheijen
 Janny Vlietstra
 Wouter van Zandbrink

Members of the European Parliament 
 

The six members (four women, two men) of the European Parliament since the European Parliamentary election of 2019 are the following:
 Agnes Jongerius
 Kati Piri
 Paul Tang
 Vera Tax
 Mohammed Chahim
 Lara Wolters

References

Further reading 
 Orlow, Dietrich. Common Destiny: A Comparative History of the Dutch, French, and German Social Democratic Parties, 1945–1969 (2000) online

External links 

  
 PvdA archives at the International Institute of Social History: Objectencollectie * Archief

 
1946 establishments in the Netherlands
Former member parties of the Socialist International
Labour parties
Organisations based in Amsterdam
Party of European Socialists member parties
Political parties established in 1946
Political parties in the Netherlands
Social democratic parties
Social democratic parties in the Netherlands
Social democratic parties in Europe